Germany was represented by Lena Valaitis, with the song "Johnny Blue", at the 1981 Eurovision Song Contest, which took place on 4 April in Dublin. "Johnny Blue" was the winner of the German national final, held on 28 February. Valaitis had previously taken part in the German final in 1976.

Before Eurovision

Ein Lied für Dublin
The final was held at the Bayerischer Rundfunk TV studios in Munich, hosted by the previous year's German representative Katja Ebstein. 12 songs took part and the winner was chosen by a panel of approximately 500 people who had been selected as providing a representative cross-section of the German public.

At Eurovision 
On the night of the final Valaitis performed 3rd in the running order, following Turkey and preceding Luxembourg. The 1981 contest is noted for providing one of the closest and most exciting voting sequences in Eurovision history, with the lead changing hands regularly between France, Germany, Ireland, Switzerland and the United Kingdom. With two countries left to vote there was a three-way tie between Germany, Switzerland and the United Kingdom, all on 120 points. Switzerland was the next to vote, and turned out to be the only country which failed to award any points at all to "Johnny Blue", while giving 8 points to the United Kingdom. A maximum 12 points to Germany from the final jury in Sweden was not to be enough, as the Swedish jury also awarded 8 points to the United Kingdom, making Bucks Fizz the contest winners by 4 points. Germany finished runners-up for the second year in succession. The German jury awarded its 12 points to France.

Voting

References

1981
Countries in the Eurovision Song Contest 1981
Eurovision